Anya Wu (born 17 February 1976) is a Taiwanese-American actress and singer.

Life

Early life
Wu was born in Taiwan on February 17, 1976. At the age of 6, she immigrated to the United States with her parents. Her mother died of cancer when she was 11.

Acting career
Wu made her film debut in Andrew Lau's Born to Be King (1999), playing Nanako.

In 2001, Wu participated in many films, such as Cop on a Mission, Runaway and 2000.

Wu rose to fame after portraying Katt in the Hong Kong action-thriller film Naked Weapon (2002). She received positive reviews.

In 2008, Wu was cast in the film Kung Fu Killer, an American Kung Fu film starring David Carradine, Daryl Hannah and Osric Chau.

In 2009, Wu starred in the romantic comedy film Chengdu, I Love You, alongside Guo Tao, Tan Sitar and Huang Xuan.

In 2011, Wu played the lead role in Mysterious Island, a Chinese horror film starring Yang Mi, Jordan Chan and Hayama Hiro.

Personal life
Wu married Chinese entrepreneur Kong Zhong, a direct male-line descendant of Confucius, their son, Aditya Kong, was born in January 2013. They had another son, Kiran Kong who was born in April 2016.

Works

Film

Television

References

External links

1977 births
Living people
Taiwanese female models
21st-century Taiwanese actresses
American female models
American actresses
Taiwanese film actresses
Place of birth missing (living people)
21st-century American women